The Colts Neck School District is a comprehensive community public school district serving students in pre-kindergarten through eighth grade in Colts Neck Township in Monmouth County, New Jersey, United States.

As of the 2020–21 school year, the district, comprised of three schools, had an enrollment of 955 students and 116.3 classroom teachers (on an FTE basis), for a student–teacher ratio of 8.2:1.

The district is classified by the New Jersey Department of Education as being in District Factor Group "I", the second-highest of eight groupings. District Factor Groups organize districts statewide to allow comparison by common socioeconomic characteristics of the local districts. From lowest socioeconomic status to highest, the categories are A, B, CD, DE, FG, GH, I and J.

The district includes three schools and an administration building. The three schools are based on a PreK-2, 3-5, and 6-8 grade configurations. The Conover Road Primary School, the newest of the three, serves grades PreK-2. The Conover Road School currently serves grades 3-5 and has a functional capacity of 420 pupils. The Cedar Drive School currently serves grades 6-8 and has a functional capacity of 479 pupils. The district's preschool handicapped program is also housed in the Cedar Drive School.

Students in public school for ninth through twelfth grades attend Colts Neck High School, along with students from portions of Howell Township. The Freehold Regional High School District serves students from Colts Neck Township, Englishtown, Farmingdale, Freehold Borough, Freehold Township, Howell Township, Manalapan Township and Marlboro Township. As of the 2020–21 school year, the high school had an enrollment of 1,316 students and 91.4 classroom teachers (on an FTE basis), for a student–teacher ratio of 14.4:1.

Schools
Schools in the district (with 2020–21 enrollment data from the National Center for Education Statistics) are:
Elementary schools
Conover Road Primary School with 374 students in grades PreK-2
Tricia Barr, Principal
Conover Road Elementary School with 310 students in grades 3-5
James Osmond, Principal
Middle school
Cedar Drive Middle School with 324 students in grades 6-8)
Colin Rigby, Principal

Administration
Core members of the district's administration are:
MaryJane Garibay, Superintendent
Vincent S. Marasco, Business Administrator / Board Secretary

Board of education
The district's board of education is comprised of nine members who set policy and oversee the fiscal and educational operation of the district through its administration. As a Type II school district, the board's trustees are elected directly by voters to serve three-year terms of office on a staggered basis, with three seats up for election each year held (since 2012) as part of the November general election. The board appoints a superintendent to oversee the district's day-to-day operations and a business administrator to supervise the business functions of the district.

References

External links
Colts Neck School District

School Data for the Colts Neck School District, National Center for Education Statistics
Colts Neck High School
Freehold Regional High School District

Colts Neck Township, New Jersey
New Jersey District Factor Group I
School districts in Monmouth County, New Jersey